Tuanfeng County is a county under the administration of the prefecture-level city of Huanggang, in the east of Hubei province, situated on the north (left) bank of the Yangtze River. There is a famous high school, named Tuanfeng High School. It provides many good students to universities all over China.

The local economy is agricultural, with cotton, wheat and rice being the primary crops.  There is little industry in the area.

Total area for Tuanfeng County is around 323.5 square mile (838 square kilometers). As of the  2000 census, the county had a population of 380,000.

Geography

Administrative divisions
Tuanfeng County administers eight towns and two townships:

References

Counties of Hubei
Huanggang